The Voortrekker Fort situated on the farm, Elandsfontein, was constructed by the Voortrekkers under Commandant General A.M. Potgieter in 1842. A commemorative tablet of the former National Monuments Council states that the fort was built "for the protection of families with the view of possible departure of a commando against the British troops from Natal".

History

According to tradition, this stone fort was built by the Voortrekkers under the leadership of Andries Hendrik Potgieter. It was presumably erected in 1842 to serve as a shelter for women and children in case the men had to leave for Port Natal to assist the Voortrekkers there against a British invasion.

The fort was built of stone and was about 24 m long and 12 m wide with embrasures at the corners to provide enfilading fire. The walls must have been about 1,5 m high. There are two roads that lead to Fochville from the national road between Johannesburg and Potchefstroom. The more southerly of these roads, the main route from Potchefstroom to Fochville, crosses the farm Elandsfontein where the ruins of this Voortrekker Fort.

See also

 List of Castles and Fortifications in South Africa
 Great trek
 Voortrekkers
 List of heritage sites in North West

References

External links
 

Castles in South Africa
Forts in South Africa
Tourist attractions in North West (South African province)
Voortrekker